The Phantom Plainsmen is a 1942 American Western "Three Mesquiteers" B-movie directed by John English and starring Bob Steele, Tom Tyler, and Rufe Davis.

Cast 
 Bob Steele as Tucson Smith
 Tom Tyler as Stony Brooke
 Rufe Davis as Lullaby Joslin
 Rudolph Anders as Colonel Eric Hartwig (as Robert O. Davis)
 Lois Collier as Judy Barrett
 Charles Miller as Cap Marvin
 Alex Callam as Kurt Redman
 Monte Montague as Henchman Muller
 Henry Rowland as Lindrick
 Richard Crane as Tad Marvin
 Jack Kirk as Joe
 Al Taylor as Heavy

References

External links 

1942 films
1942 Western (genre) films
American Western (genre) films
American black-and-white films
Films directed by John English
Republic Pictures films
Three Mesquiteers films
1940s English-language films
1940s American films